A puro corazón, is a Venezuelan telenovela produced by Francisco Busatto for Televen. It is a remake of the Venezuelan telenovela, A todo corazón produced by Venevisión in 1998.

Plot 
The story revolves around a group of students in the final year of high school, a crucial stage in the life of the teenager.

Cast 
José Ramón Barreto as Alejandro Rodríguez
Michelle De Andrade as Patricia Gutiérrez
Lino Bellini as "Zacarias Mora (Zacky)"
Carla Fiorella Gardié as Coraima López
Rebeca Herrera Martínez as Lorena
Daniela Dos Santos as Laurita Palmero
Eulices Alvarado as Elías Mujica "El Gato"
Ever Bastidas as Leo Gutiérrez
Viviana Majzoub as Jessica Iturriza
Carlos Daniel Alvarado as Tito Pérez
Alejandro Grossmann as Randy Palmero

References

External links 

Televen telenovelas
Spanish-language telenovelas
Venezuelan telenovelas
2015 telenovelas
2015 Venezuelan television series debuts
2016 Venezuelan television series endings
Television series about teenagers
Television shows set in Venezuela